ShakeClub is a chain of milkshake bars based in Sheffield, England. ShakeClub was set up by a collation of 4 young students from Sheffield Hallam University, The University of Sheffield, Nottingham Trent University, and Bilborough College.

ShakeClub takes consumers' favourite sweets, chocolates, and biscuits and turns them into milkshakes using a dairy based milkshake mix and milk using Blendtec blenders. The first ShakeClub store opened in Broomhill, Sheffield on 9 February 2009. ShakeClub quickly expanded to Sheffield City Centre, and the doors to the second store opened on 8 June 2009. Plans for further expansion are currently under development.

The summer of 2009 saw ShakeClub introduce a fresh fruit smoothie range, thus offering a healthy option to consumers.

To celebrate reaching 1,000 fans on Facebook, ShakeClub offered free toppings on every large shake for one day only.

ShakeClub announced they were closing their doors on October 2010, having been open for barely a year.

References

Companies based in Sheffield